Hospital at the End of the City is a Czechoslovak television series first released in 1978 by Czechoslovak Television. It featured an ensemble cast and received much viewer praise in Central Europe. The series, with a screenplay by Jaroslav Dietl and directed by Jaroslav Dudek, ran from 1978 to 1981 for a total of twenty episodes. The show's success inspired the German television series The Black Forest Clinic.

Synopsis
The series follows Dr. Sova, head of the orthopedic department at a hospital in the fictional town of Bor, and his colleagues. It focuses both on their work and private lives.

Cast and characters

 Ladislav Chudík as Dr. Karel Sova
 Josef Abrhám as Dr. Arnošt Blažej
 Eliška Balzerová as Dr. Alžběta Čeňková
 Ladislav Frej as Dr. Karel Sova Jr.
 Miloš Kopecký as Dr. Josef Štrosmajer
 Jana Štěpánková as Dr. Dana Králová
 Josef Vinklář as Dr. Cvach
 Iva Janžurová as Nurse Marta Huňková, later Pěnkavová
 Ladislav Pešek as Dr. František Vrtiška
 Oldřich Kaiser as Dr. Vojtěch Peterka
 Hana Maciuchová as Alena Blažejová
 Jaroslav Moučka as Kovanda, Alena's father
 Daniela Kolářová as Kateřina Sovová
 Josef Dvořák as Václav Pěnkava
 Vladimír Menšík as Josef Vandas
 Viktor Preiss as Přemysl Rezek
 Zdenka Procházková as Rezková, Přemysl's mother
 Josef Somr as hospital director Pekař
 Jiří Kodet as Bohun Bauer
 Kateřina Burianová as the kid sister
 Dana Medřická as Dr. Fastová
 Svatopluk Beneš as Dr. Fastová's husband
 Dagmar Veškrnová as Kabíčková
 Věra Tichánková as Nurse Trochtová
 Stella Zázvorková as Růžena Dobiášova
 Martin Růžek as Dr. Petr Chalaba
 Ota Sklenčka as University dean
 Jana Andresíková as Karel Sova's dissertation reviewer
 Květa Fialová as the dean's secretary
 Antonín Molčík as secretary of the hockey team
 Jiří Adamíra as associate professor Hybner
 Karel Effa as hospital attendant
 Zdeněk Dítě as restaurant server

Production and release
Initial filming began in 1976 with Karel Höger in the lead role of Dr. Sova, but the actor died suddenly in 1977, and was replaced by Slovak actor Ladislav Chudík. The show premiered on 5 November 1978 and was met with great success, both in Czechoslovakia and Germany, after being broadcast in 21 countries. After the first season, which consisted of thirteen episodes, another season was commissioned, for a further seven episodes. In addition to fictionalized portrayals of hospital activity, the series contained footage of authentic surgeries, mainly in the field of orthopedics.

Sequels and parody
A sequel series was developed in 2003, called Hospital at the End of the City, Twenty Years On, starring most of the original cast. Thirteen episodes were produced. In 2008, another set of thirteen episodes followed, this time under the title Hospital at the End of the City – The New Generation.

In 1999, a parody series titled Hospital on the Verge of Destruction came out.

References

External links
 
 

Czechoslovak television series
1970s Czechoslovak television series
1980s Czechoslovak television series
1978 Czechoslovak television series debuts
1981 Czechoslovak television series endings
Czech drama television series
Medical television series
Czech medical television series